Many Colored Kite is an album by American singer/songwriter Mark Olson, released in 2010.

Reception

Writing for Allmusic, music critic Mark Deming called the album; "a deeply introspective set of songs, with a keenly spiritual undertow running through these meditations on love, nature, and humanity. Not as cohesive as The Salvation Blues, Many Colored Kites is still a worthy and brave album that finds Mark Olson continuing to find new ways of sharing what life has taught him through his music."

Track listing
All songs by Mark Olson except as noted.

 "Little Bird of Freedom" (Mark Olson, Ingunn Ringvold) – 4:11
"Morning Dove" – 4:34
"Many Colored Kite" – 3:53
"Bluebell Song" – 3:38
"Beehive" – 3:42
"No Time to Live Without Her" – 3:49
"Your Life Beside Us" – 4:58
"Scholastica" – 3:22
"Kingsnake" – 3:05
"Wind & Rain" (Olson, Ringvold) – 3:41		
"More Hours" – 3:50

Personnel
Mark Olson – vocals, banjo, bass, dulcimer, guitar, piano, Melodica
Danny Frankel – drums, percussion
Phil Baker – bass, double bass
Beau Raymond – glockenspiel, percussion,  background vocals
Vashti Bunyan – harmony vocals, background vocals
Jolie Holland – harmony vocals, background vocals
Ingunn Ringvold – djembe, percussion, piano, harmony vocals, background vocals
Shay Scott – Hammond B3 organ
Neal Casal – bass, guitar, slide guitar
Michele Gazich – viola, violin
Ashia Grzesik – cello

Production notes
Beau Raymond – producer, engineer, mixing
Joe Gastwirt – mastering
Jeremy Sherrer – engineer
David Gorman – design
Michele Gazich – string arrangements

References

2010 albums
Mark Olson (musician) albums
Rykodisc albums